Målfrid Longva, née Myklebust (20 January 1925 – 9 September 2012) was a Norwegian politician for the Labour Party.

She was born in Vartdal as a daughter of a fisher. She finished school in Ørskog in 1944, and later took a domestic science education in Ålesund. She spent her career as a cafe and cafeteria manager in Brattvåg in Haram.

She started her political career as a member of Haram school board from 1965 to 1971 (later the county school board from 1976 to 1979). She was then a member of Haram municipal council from 1965 to 1967 and 1971 to 1979, and Møre og Romsdal county council from 1975 to 1979.

She served as a deputy representative to the Parliament of Norway from Møre og Romsdal during the terms 1973–1977 and 1977–1981. From January 1978 to October 1979 she met as a regular representative, covering for Asbjørn Jordahl who was a member of Nordli's Cabinet. She was a member of the Standing Committee on Administration.

She was a deputy board chair of Rikstrygdeverket from 1975 to 1979 and Sunnmøre Arbeideravis from 1982 to 1985. She was also active in the cooperative, the Norwegian Red Cross and Noregs Mållag.

References

1925 births
2012 deaths
People from Haram, Norway
Labour Party (Norway) politicians
Møre og Romsdal politicians
Members of the Storting
Women members of the Storting